The 2012 Central Arkansas Bears football team represented the University of Central Arkansas in the 2012 NCAA Division I FCS football season. The Bears were led by 13th year head coach Clint Conque and played their home games at Estes Stadium. They were a member of the Southland Conference. They finished the season 9–3, 6–1 in Southland play to share the conference championship with Sam Houston State. Due to their victory over Sam Houston State, the Bears received the Southland's automatic bid into the FCS Playoffs where they lost in the second round to Georgia Southern.

Media
All Central Arkansas games can be listened to on KHLR 106.7 FM and are streamed online through the station's website.

Schedule

Game summaries

Ole Miss

Sources:

Murray State

Sources:

Bacone College
Sources:

#3 Sam Houston State

The 7th meeting between the Bearkats and the Bears will provide one team with the series lead. Currently the two are 3-3 in head-to-head matches with the Bears having won the first 3 matches and the Bearkats having won the past 3.

Sources:

Stephen F. Austin

The Bears look to build on last years win and build upon the 4-2 record they have against the Lumberjacks. However, the Lumberjacks have recent history on their side, having won the 2009 and 2010 matches.

Sources:

Nicholls State

The Bears have never lost to the Colonels at home, owning a 3-0 record and a 4-2 series lead overall. The Bears have also won 3 straight in the series and 4 of the last 5 games.

Sources:

McNeese State

The Bears own a 3-3 record against the Cowboys. However, they have won two games in a row and 3 of the last 4 to even the series.

Sources:

Lamar

The Cardinals head to Conway, Arkansas for the second match against their SLC rival, the Bears. Currently Central Arkansas leads the series 1-0.

Sources:

Southeastern Louisiana

The team the Bears have had the most success against in the SLC is the Lions. The Bears own a 4-1 series advantage and have won two straight as they head into this 2012 contest.

Sources:

Northwestern State

SLC play ends with the match against the Demons. The rivalry has been unexpectedly close, with the Bears hold a 3-2 series advantage. After winning in 2011, the Bears hope to make it two consecutive wins.

Sources:

Eastern Illinois

Sources:

Ranking movements

References

Central Arkansas
Central Arkansas Bears football seasons
Southland Conference football champion seasons
Central Arkansas
Central Arkansas Bears football